The Honda Ape is a minibike sold in the Japanese market. While technically classed as a minibike due to its small frame and 50 cc or 100 cc engines, its height makes it rideable for an adult. The Ape features four-stroke engines, and five-speed transmissions. 

It is sometimes classed as a monkey bike alongside the Honda Monkey and Honda Gorilla.

References

External links
 Honda Ape official site

Ape
Minibikes